Carukiidae is a family of box jellyfish within the Cubozoa class. Carukiidae can be easily classified by their lack of cirri clumps inside the cubozoan stomach, as well as the size and the placement of their nematocysts.

Carukiidae use nematocysts as a defense mechanism; they releases a venom from the tips of their nematocysts, producing the Irukandji syndrome. Even though positions of spines on the shaft of the Carukiidae cause illness, there are areas on the body that do not. The rhopalial niche openings, which discern light, do not incur any illness. The Carukiidae also have non-venomous rhopaliar horns, which are imperceptive in function and located above the rhopalial niches.

Irukandji syndrome triggered by Carukiidae requires immediate medical attention. In the event that it goes untreated in humans, cardiac arrest is a potentially deadly consequence.

Classification
 Carukia
 Carukia barnesi (Southcott, 1967)
 Carukia shinju (Gershwin, 2005)
 Gerongia
 Gerongia rifkinae (Gershwin & Alderslade, 2005)
 Malo
 Malo kingi (Gershwin, 2007)
 Malo maxima (Gershwin, 2005)
 Malo filipina (Bentlage & Lewis, 2012)
 Malo bella (Gershwin, 2014)
 Morbakka
 Morbakka fenneri (Gershwin, 2008)
 Morbakka virulenta (Kishinouyea, 1910)

References

 

 
Carybdeida
Cnidarian families